Jackson Arley Martínez Valencia (born 3 October 1986) is a Colombian former professional footballer who played as a striker. 

He started his career with Independiente Medellin in 2004 and becoming the league's top scorer in 2009, before being signed by Chiapas in January 2010. He spent three years with the Mexican side before moving to Portugal to play for Porto, where he was the Primeira Liga's top scorer in all three of his seasons with the club. In July 2015, Martínez joined Atlético Madrid for €35 million, and six months later Guangzhou Evergrande of China for €42 million. He  suffered an ankle injury in late 2016 that ruled him out for two years, before ending his career back in Portugal with Portimonense in 2020.

Martínez represented Colombia 40 times between 2009 and 2015, scoring nine goals for the country. He played for them at the Copa América in 2011 and 2015, as well as the 2014 FIFA World Cup, where he scored two goals against Japan.

Club career

Independiente Medellín
Born in Quibdó in the Chocó Department, Martínez played his youth career with Independiente Medellín until being called up to the first team for the 2004 Finalización. In January 2009, he scored a hat-trick against Peñarol in the 2009 Copa Libertadores first stage to help his team make it to the group stage with a 4–0 aggregate win. 

Martinez began the 2009 Apertura campaign in great form, scoring 4 goals in 4 matches. However, he suffered an injury in March 2009 before a Copa Libertadores match against America de Cali, which saw him miss the rest of the 2009 Apertura campaign, as Medellin had a rough campaign and finished in last place. Despite this setback, he bounced back and was the top goalscorer of the 2009 Torneo Finalizacion with 18 goals, including braces against Real Cartagena, América de Cali, Atlético Huila, and Envigado, while leading El Poderoso to its fifth league title with a goal in each leg of the finals against Huila.

Chiapas
Martínez attracted interest from South Korean club Ulsan Hyundai and Argentine clubs San Lorenzo de Almagro and Racing Avellaneda. He initially signed a pre-contract with Ulsan Hyundai, but the club could not reach an agreement with him. As a result, Martínez was eventually signed by Chiapas from the Liga MX on a three-year-contract for an undisclosed fee in January 2010. 

He scored his first two goals with the club on 30 January in a 2–2 draw against Tigres UANL. Two weeks later, he scored against Pachuca, and then scored three in the next three games. He ended his first season with the club, the 2010 Torneo Bicentenario, with nine goals, placing him fourth in the top scorer's table. In August 2010, he had an ankle operation and was ruled out for a month. In the following season, the 2010 Apertura, he didn't perform well, only scoring two in fourteen appearances, but scored a match winner against Atlas in the penultimate matchday to give Chiapas a spot in the playoffs, where they were eliminated by eventual champions Santos Laguna. 

In the 2011 Clausura, Martinez missed most of the season due to an injury he suffered in the Copa Libertadores match against Alianza Lima on 27 January, which ruled him out for almost three months. In his return on 30 April, he scored a brace in a 4–1 victory against Querétaro, but his team finished bottom of the table. However, in the Copa Libertadores, Chiapas had much better form and Martínez was a key player for them, scoring in both legs of the round of 16 encounter against Colombian club Junior to help his team go through on away goals. In the first leg at Estadio Víctor Manuel Reyna, he scored in a 1–1 draw, and then scored a double in the second leg, despite being shown a red card during the 3–3 draw in Barranquilla. Chiapas were eventually eliminated by Paraguayan side Cerro Porteño in the quarter finals, with the Colombian playing in the second leg.

In the Apertura 2012 season, he scored eight goals, including braces against San Luis and Pumas UNAM, and added to his tally by scoring once in each leg of the playoffs against Santos, but Chiapas were eliminated. Martínez was named captain of the squad at the beginning of the Clausura 2012 season, where he scored eight goals, with two braces again, this time in victories against Atlas and Queretaro. In the playoffs, Chiapas were paired up with Santos again, and Martinez scored a brace in the first leg, but his team were not able to get revenge and were eliminated by Santos again for the third time in eighteen months.

Porto

2012–13 season

On 7 July 2012, Porto announced that they had signed Martínez on a four-year contract worth €8.8 million, in addition to setting a €40 million release clause. On 11 August, he played his first competitive match in the 2012 Supertaça against Académica de Coimbra, also scoring his first goal. He scored in the 90th minute, which gave Porto their 19th victory of the tournament, and was named as the man of the match.

Martínez scored his first league goal on 25 August with a Panenka penalty against Vitória de Guimarães, with Porto winning the game 4–0. On 22 September against Beira-Mar, he scored a bicycle kick from a chipped pass by fellow countryman James Rodríguez. Against rivals Sporting CP, he scored a back-heel volley in a 2–0 win. In the Champions League group stage on 24 October, Martínez scored his first two goals in European competitions, during a match which ended in a 3–2 victory for Porto against Dynamo Kyiv. Martínez continued his goal scoring streak in a 2–1 victory over Estoril on 28 October, assisting Silvestre Varela and scoring the game winner five minutes later. On 2 November, he scored two more goals in a 5–0 victory against Marítimo. He was named the SJPF Player of the Month for October and November. In December, Spanish sports newspaper Marca ranked him number 8 in a list of the Top 10 South American players of 2012.

Martínez scored five goals in January 2013: the only goal against Nacional on 5 January,  in O Clássico against rivals Benfica on 13 January, a double ten days later in a 3–0 away victory against Vitoria Setubal, and against Gil Vicente on 28 January. By the halfway point of the league season, he had scored 14 goals in the first 15 league games, surpassing Falcao's numbers of 10 goals in 14 games. On 2 February, he scored a hat-trick against Vitória de Guimarães, which included two headers, making it his first hat-trick for Porto. He scored a brace on 23 February, including a penalty and a volley, to help Porto turn around a 0–1 deficit into a 2–1 victory against Rio Ave at Estádio do Dragão. He was named the February SJPF Player of the Month. In the final match of the league season against Paços de Ferreira, Martínez sealed the 2–0 victory after scoring the second goal and assuring Porto's third consecutive league title, undefeated and one point ahead of rivals Benfica. The goal also marked his 26th goal in the league, securing him the Bola da Prata. Following his debut season in Europe, ESPN noted Martínez as one of the best signings for the 2012–13 season.

2013–14 season

In the 2013 Supertaça Cândido de Oliveira, Martínez scored the second goal in a 3–0 victory against Vitória de Guimarães at the Estádio Municipal de Aveiro, claiming his second Portuguese SuperCup in a row.

In the opening league match against Vitória de Setúbal on 18 August, Martínez scored the third goal in a 3–1 win. He continued the season in excellent form, adding four more goals in the next four matchdays. On 6 October, he scored a double against recently promoted Arouca in a win by the same score. He scored the only goal of the game in the Europa League round of 16 first leg against Napoli on 13 March, and Porto eventually qualified to the next round by winning 3–2 on aggregate. On 19 January 2014, Martínez scored his 50th goal in all competitions for Porto in a 3–0 win over Vitória. On 6 April, he scored a double, including a penalty, in a 3–1 victory against Académica. He ended up being the league's top scorer for the second consecutive season with 20 goals, becoming the first player to be top scorer for two consecutive seasons since Mario Jardel from 1997 to 2000 in the process.

2014–15 season
After the 2014 World Cup, Martinez was linked with many clubs, in particular Chelsea, Arsenal, and Valencia. However, in August 2014, he extended his contract with Porto until 2017. On 30 September, he came on as a substitute in a Champions League group stage match away to Shakhtar Donetsk, and his team was trailing 2–0 to the Ukrainian hosts at the 85th minute. He scored two goals in four minutes; in the 89th minute, he scored a penalty and then equalised in added time to level the scoreline at 2–2, which completed a comeback that was dubbed as "stunning" and "remarkable" by UEFA. Martinez was voted Player of the Month for December 2014 and January 2015. In the Champions League quarter-final first leg on 15 April 2015 against Bayern Munich, he scored the last goal in a 3–1 victory and also won the penalty that Ricardo Quaresma scored for the opening goal after being fouled by goalkeeper Manuel Neuer. Martínez netted again in the second leg six days later, heading a consolation from Héctor Herrera's cross as Porto lost 1–6 at the Allianz Arena, thus being eliminated from the competition.

Atlético Madrid
Martínez was linked heavily with Arsenal again following his departure from Porto, but on 27 June 2015, he confirmed that he was moving to Spanish side Atlético Madrid. Four days later, it was announced on Porto's official website that Atlético were willing to pay the full €35 million release fee for the Colombian player. On 15 July, Atlético officially announced the transfer, and he signed a four-year-contract running until 2019. He was officially presented at the Vicente Calderón Stadium on 26 July in front of around 10,000 people. 

Martínez made his La Liga debut on 22 August, being substituted after an hour for Fernando Torres in a 1–0 home win over Las Palmas. A week later, Martínez came off the bench and scored his first goal for Atlético in a 3–0 victory over Sevilla. On 21 October, he scored his first UEFA Champions League goal for the club against FC Astana in a 4–0 win, and four days later, he opened the scoring in a 2–1 victory against Valencia. On 12 November, while playing for the Colombia national team against Chile, he suffered an ankle injury and had to be taken off the field on a stretcher, which ruled him out for a month. He made his return on 30 December in a 0–2 away win against Rayo Vallecano, entering the pitch in the 70th minute and assisting Antoine Griezmann's goal in the last minute.

He left the club a few weeks later because he struggled to adapt to Diego Simeone's playing style, as he was more accustomed to playing as a lone striker with Porto. The press labelled him "a flop" and some of his teammates said he was not confident, with club president Enrique Cerezo adding that the player "wasn't at the level of the club".

Guangzhou Evergrande
On 3 February 2016, Martínez was transferred to Chinese Super League side Guangzhou Evergrande Taobao with a fee of €42 million, a record for an Asian team. The record was broken two days later, when Alex Teixeira signed for Jiangsu Suning for £38.4 million (roughly €50 million). On 24 February, he made his debut against South Korean club Pohang Steelers. On 6 March, he scored on his Chinese Super League debut in an eventual 2–1 loss away at Chongqing Lifan. A week later, he scored and gave an assist in a 3–0 win against Changchun Yatai. On 15 April, during a match against Henan Jianye, he suffered an ankle injury and had to be substituted, which ruled him out for two months. He had ankle surgery a few days later, which ruled him out for a further five weeks. He returned to action on 9 August in a goalless draw against Beijing Guoan, playing the last 20 minutes of the match. 

In October 2016, after playing 16 games, Martínez suffered an ankle injury that ruled him out for two years. He had another ankle surgery in July 2017. In March 2018, Guangzhou Evergrande terminated his contract and released him because of his injuries, believing that there was no point of paying his salary if he could not play.

Portimonense
On 31 August 2018, Martínez returned to Portugal's top flight, joining Portimonense on a season-long loan. The deal was subsequently made permanent, but only until the end of 2019. He made his debut in a 3–2 victory against Vitória de Guimarães on 23 September, playing the last 17 minutes of the match. On 3 November, he scored his first goal for the club, a penalty, in a 1–1 draw against Belenenses SAD. On 7 December, he returned to the Estádio do Dragão for the first time since leaving Porto, playing 75 minutes and receiving a standing ovation by the fans and players as he was substituted. A week later, he scored a brace in a 3–1 win against Vitória de Setúbal. On 11 May 2019, he scored an 88th-minute winner against Maritimo in a 3–2 victory. In October 2019, Jackson scored his first goal for the club in the Taça de Portugal against Académica de Coimbra, a match which Portimonense lost 2–1. 

In January 2020, he signed a new contract with the Portuguese club, keeping him until 2022. However, still troubled by his chronic ankle injuries, Martínez left Portimonense in August 2020, stating that he wanted to return to Independiente Medellín.

On 7 December 2020, after spending six months as a free agent, Martínez officially announced his retirement.

International career
A Colombian international at the age of 22, he made his debut and scored his first international goal on 5 September 2009 in a 2–0 victory against Ecuador as part of the 2010 FIFA World Cup qualifiers. Four days later, he came on as a substitute and scored his second international goal against Uruguay, although Colombia lost 3–1. On 7 June 2011, he was selected by Hernán Darío Gómez to the 23-man-squad for the 2011 Copa América.

On 2 June 2014, Martínez was named by coach José Pékerman in Colombia's 23-man squad for the 2014 FIFA World Cup. After a substitute appearance in the team's opening match win over Greece, Martínez was selected to start in the final group game against Japan, where he scored twice in a 4–1 win and was named man of the match.

Martínez was also chosen for the 2015 Copa América in Chile. The last time he was called up to the national team was for a 2018 World Cup qualification match against Chile on 12 November 2015, where he suffered an injury.

Personal life 
His nickname "Cha Cha Cha" came from his father, Orlando Martinez, who was a second division footballer in Colombia. He would celebrate his goals by doing the "Cha Cha Cha" dance, and so his teammates began to call him that. The nickname was passed on to Jackson and he often does the celebration as well. 

Martínez married Tatiana Castillo in March 2013, and the couple have a son named Josue. He is a Christian. In September 2018, he released a seven-track Christian hip hop album titled No Temeré ("I Will Not Fear").

Martinez has two sisters. In his youth, Martínez played baseball, basketball, and volleyball. He said these sports helped improve his agility and jumping ability, which he used to score acrobatic goals.

Martínez also runs a foundation named after him, called "Fundacion Jackson Martinez", which aims to help kids living in poverty buy adequate football gear, play competitive matches, and get scouted.

Style of play 
Martínez was known as a prolific goalscorer, being able to use both feet effectively, and having excellent volleying technique. He combined his volleying technique with his agility, which allowed him to score multiple acrobatic goals throughout his career. His height made him an aerial threat, and he combined this with his strength to win aerial battles. His strength also made it difficult for opponents to knock him off the ball. Former Porto player Paulo Futre compared his traits to those of George Weah. Noted BBC journalist Tim Vickery described him as "an out-and-out goalscorer, a front-to-goal centre-forward who can finish off both feet, and with an excellent jump that makes him an aerial threat." Manager Arsene Wenger said in 2015 that Martinez "could play in the Premier League because he has the body to make the difference," and that he was "a good finisher."

Career statistics

Club

International
Source:

International goals
Scores and results list Colombia's goal tally first.

Honours
Independiente Medellín
 Categoría Primera A: 2009-II

Porto
 Primeira Liga: 2012–13
 Supertaça Cândido de Oliveira: 2012, 2013

Guangzhou Evergrande
 Chinese Super League: 2016
 Chinese FA Super Cup: 2016
 Chinese FA Cup: 2016
Individual
 Categoría Primera A Top goal scorer: 2009 Finalizacion
Categoria Primera A Best Player: 2009 Finalizacion
Categoria Primera A Dream Team: 2009 Finalizacion
 Supertaça Cândido de Oliveira Man of the match: 2012
 SJPF Player of the Month: October 2012, November 2012, February 2013, December 2014, January 2015
 O Jogo Team of the Year: 2012, 2013
 Primeira Liga Top goal scorer: 2012–13, 2013–14, 2014–15
FC Porto Athlete of the Year: 2014, 2015

Notes

References

External links

 
 
 

1986 births
Living people
Colombian Christians
People from Quibdó
Footballers from Medellín
Colombian footballers
Association football forwards
Independiente Medellín footballers
Chiapas F.C. footballers
FC Porto players
Atlético Madrid footballers
Guangzhou F.C. players
Portimonense S.C. players
Categoría Primera A players
Liga MX players
Primeira Liga players
La Liga players
Chinese Super League players
Colombia international footballers
2011 Copa América players
2014 FIFA World Cup players
2015 Copa América players
Colombian expatriate footballers
Colombian expatriate sportspeople in Mexico
Colombian expatriate sportspeople in Portugal
Colombian expatriate sportspeople in Spain
Colombian expatriate sportspeople in China
Expatriate footballers in Mexico
Expatriate footballers in Portugal
Expatriate footballers in Spain
Expatriate footballers in China
Colombian people of African descent